Anié or Ana is a town in the Plateaux Region of Togo, about 26 km north of Atakpame. It is served by a station on the national railway network.

Populated places in Plateaux Region, Togo